Lawrence Segawa (born 10 September 1984 in Jinja) is a Ugandan international footballer last playing for Uganda Revenue Authority SC.

Career
He has played for Police FC before moving abroad. In 2006, he moved to Sudan where he signed with the country's giants Al-Merreikh. Next he moved to Serbia, and signed, during the winter break of the 2009–10 season, with FK Srem from Sremska Mitrovica, a club with an already established tradition of importing Ugandan footballers, and where he will join his fellow national team player Vincent Kayizi.

External sources
 
 Profile at Srbijafudbal.

Living people
1984 births
Ugandan footballers
Uganda international footballers
Expatriate footballers in Sudan
FK Srem players
Expatriate footballers in Serbia
Association football midfielders
Al-Merrikh SC players